La Barceloneta is a neighborhood in the Ciutat Vella district of Barcelona, Catalonia, Spain.  The neighborhood was constructed during the 18th century for the residents of the Ribera neighborhood who had been displaced by the construction of the Ciutadella of Barcelona.  The neighborhood is roughly triangular, bordered by the Mediterranean Sea, the Moll d'Espanya of Port Vell, and the El Born neighborhood.  This neighborhood has its own flag, and is serviced by its own stop on the Barcelona Metro line 4. This is a good starting point for whatever itinerary there may be to adventure through La Barceloneta. The yellow line, L4, which is the metro line that stops at La Barceloneta, is the most popular for pickpocketing. The neighborhood can also be discovered by taking Las Gorondrinas, which leave from the front port of the Columbus monument. This way the marine strip can be discovered, but the real charm of this neighborhood is by getting lost in the side streets or alleyways. Torre Sant Sebastià is the terminus of the Port Vell Aerial Tramway; opened in 1931, it connects La Barceloneta with Montjuïc across Port Vell.

La Barceloneta is known for its sandy beach (which made an appearance in Don Quixote, book 2) and its many restaurants and nightclubs along the boardwalk. Over the past several years the quality of the sand on the beach has become a source of continued controversy.  In February 2008,  the World Health Organization began an inquiry designed to ascertain whether the sand meets WHO beach health and safety guidelines.

With its modernity, La Barceloneta continues to inhabit the scent of salt and marine life. For many, this is considered a luxury.  La Barceloneta also attracts many cruise ships to dock.

Among the attractions on Barceloneta's beach are German artist Rebecca Horn's "Homenatge a la Barceloneta" monument, and, where the beach gives way to the Port Olímpic, Frank Gehry's modern "Peix d'Or" sculpture.

In the center of the neighborhood, there is a small museum, called "Casa de la Barceloneta", which is housed in a preserved building dating back to 1761. Admission to the museum serves as an insight into the evolution of the neighborhood and its history. The house has a stone façade with letters and number engraved that are inscriptions of the plots used in construction.

History 
La Barceloneta was mainly underwater until the 1600s. During the construction of Port Vell, a dike was built linking the small island of Maians to the city, and landfill created the ground on which the neighborhood was later built.

La Barceloneta was practically an uninhabited zone until the mid 18th century. Fishermen were the first to frequent this part of Barcelona even though the sea conditions were very precarious. In 1754, construction of the first houses began, and the neighborhood began to become filled with residents who took part in activities of the port.

The neighborhood of La Barceloneta was designed by an engineer named Juan Martín Cermeño. The famous markets located in La Barceloneta were designed by the Catalan architect Antoni Rovira i Trias in 1873. He had an urban plan for the future of Barcelona architecture which won the 1859 municipal contest by city council's decree, but the central government in Madrid favored the plan of Ildefons Cerdà. Rovira and his work were soon forgotten and lost in history, until a book was published about his style of urban planning and the other works he was responsible for, like the numerous markets in La Barceloneta.

In the present day, in the building of Palau de Mar on the Passeig de Joan de Borbó, exists the History Museum of Catalonia. This museum contains a permanent exhibit about the history of Catalonia up until its industrialization, the era of dictatorship, or the present day democracy. Additionally, the terrace of their cafeteria has an excellent view of the neighborhood and the port.

This neighborhood is far from lacking ancient history with its churches, like the Sant Miquel del Port located in the Barceloneta plaza. This church is located near the beach campus of Pompeu Fabra University.

In close distance to the History Museum of Catalonia resides the Clock Tower. This is an example of some of the ancient constructions in the neighborhood. It was constructed in 1772 within the Fishermen's Wharf and worked as the lighthouse port up until the mid 19th century. When the port was modernized, the use for the lighthouse became obsolete. To maintain its base, the tower was transformed into a clock in the mid 19th century. This clock tower was one of the materials used by scientist Pierre Méchain as he measured the length of the meridian arc between Barcelona and Dunkirk in 1791, which led to the creation of the decimal metric system.

La Llotja, another building found in La Barceloneta neighborhood, is a neoclassical building with a Gothic interior built in the 14th century. Inside the two-story building are examples of medieval works and neoclassical sculptures. In 1775, la Llotja became involved with the Real Academia, a school associated with the industrial arts and other visual arts. At that time, the school was named la Escuela Gratuita de Diseño and was located on the highest floor of la Llotja. It was not until 1928 that it renamed itself the Real Academia de Bellas Artes de San Jorge, and in 1989 converted its name into Catalan: Reial Acadèmia Catalana de Belles Arts de Sant Jordi (English: Royal Catalan Academy of Fine Arts of Saint George).

The Carmen Amaya Fountain is another historical landmark placed within La Barceloneta in 1959. It is located where Carrer Sant Carles joins the beach. It was constructed as tribute for the most famous flamenco dancer on history Carmen Amaya, who was born in a Gypsy settlement in La Barceloneta in 1913. The fountain itself portrays two guitarists and three flamenco dancers in the nude. It represents the uneasy past that La Barceloneta endured when it was populated by gypsies, fishermen, and full of shacks. In the 1970s, the shacks were dismantled, but the memories did not disappear. It was almost soon forgotten after the 1992 Summer Olympics in Barcelona.

Present day 

In the present day, the neighborhood of La Barceloneta continues to be perceived as foreign to the city of which it is located. However, the environment has changed dramatically, and with that, especially in the summer, for when the beach is most popular. From day to night, the beach of La Barceloneta is the most animated of all of Barcelona. La Barceloneta is home to a number of small bars or clubs, where one can eat dinner or order a drink until the wee hours of the early morning. Upon arrival to the beach, the environment and atmosphere of La Barceloneta changes. Today, the cosmopolitan neighborhood reaches its maximum entertainment factor in the summer.

La Barceloneta is considered one of the best places to try fresh fish or paella in Barcelona. A selection of tapas are also offered off any menu. The most typical of the tapas of La Barceloneta would be called the "bomba." It is a ball of potatoes filled with meat and the selection of spicy sauce or the classic aioli. A "caña," a glass of beer from a barrel, is always served as well. Towards the beach, one might come across balconies with clothes hanging to dry, all types of shops, wineries, bars, and restaurants.

La Barceloneta also homes a large Aquarium. This aquarium is said to be the biggest of Europe where one can discover the marine life of the Mediterranean Sea. The space composes of 20 large tanks and a transparent tunnel by which one can pass through sharks.

See also 
 Barceloneta (Barcelona Metro)

 Street names in Barcelona
 Urban planning of Barcelona

References

External links

 Barceloneta.com

Neighbourhoods of Barcelona
Beaches of Barcelona
Beaches of Catalonia
Ciutat Vella